Weathermen may refer to:

 Weather Underground, American political movement commonly called "the Weathermen", 1969–1977
 The Weathermen (band), a semi-satirical Belgian electronic and pop group
 The Weathermen (hip hop group), an American collective
 Combat Weathermen, US Air Force tactical observer/forecasters with ground combat capabilities
 Jonathan King, an English singer-songwriter who used the pseudonym "Weathermen"
 "The Weathermen", a song on Live at Tonic (Marco Benevento album), released in 2007
 "Weathermen", a song on the 2004 album Flowers in the Pavement, by Australian group Bliss n Eso
 New Weathermen Records, an imprint of Ferret Music, an American independent record label

See also 
 And the Weathermen Shrug Their Shoulders, 1993 album by Dutch band The Ex
 Weatherman (disambiguation)